Tattooed Beat Messiah is the 1988 debut full-length studio release by Zodiac Mindwarp and the Love Reaction. Engineered by Femi Jiya and Mark Freegard. Mixed by Nigel Green. The album reached #132 on the US Billboard 200 and #20 on the UK album charts in March 1988 supported by music videos for the "Prime Mover" (single, April 1987), "Backseat Education" (single, October 1987, UK #49), and "Planet Girl" (single, March 1988, UK #63). Tracks included on the album that had been released in 1987 were remixed for inclusion on the album. "Prime Mover" would be the band's most successful single reaching #18 on the UK singles charts in May 1987, well in advance of the eventual album release. The single also charted in New Zealand hitting #12.

The album was reissued in January 1998 as "The Best of Zodiac Mindwarp" including the "Born To Be Wild" track. Rock Candy Records  issued a 24-bit remastered version of the album in August 2007 including the 9 tracks that had originally been used as singles B-sides.

Track listing
All tracks composed by Mark Manning; except where indicated

Side one
 "Wolf Child Speech" (0:30) 
 "Prime Mover" (3:13)
 "Skull Spark Joker" (2:27) 
 "Backseat Education" (3:04) 
 "Hey Baby" (0:05) 
 "Bad Girl City" (3:00) 
 "Untamed Stare" (2:41) 
 "Tattooed Beat Messiah" (3:36)

Side two
 "Born to Be Wild" (3:20) – (Mars Bonfire)
 "Upside Down" (0:09) 
 "Let's Break the Law" (3:35) 
 "Spasm Gang" (2:44) 
 "Holy Gasoline" (4:14) 
 "Planet Girl" (2:37) 
 "Kids Stuff" (4:55) 
 "Messianic Reprise" (1:05)

2007 Rock Candy reissue bonus tracks
 "Laughing in the Face of Death" (2:52) – Manning
 "Hangover from Hell" (3:41) – Manning
 "Mess With the Killer" (2:32) – Manning
 "Whore of Babylon" (3:32) – Manning
 "Lager Woman from Hell" (3:18) – Manning, Munro
 "Messin' With My Best Friend's Girl" (3:25) – Manning
 "Dog Face Driver" (2:03) – Manning
 "Born to Be Wild" (3:20) – Bonfire
 "Go Go Baby Dream Show" (3:18) – Manning

In some markets "Born To Be Wild" had originally only been available as a bonus track on the "Planet Girl" single. For the 2007 reissue it was integrated as one of the bonus tracks rather than appearing in the original track order. The B-sides were produced by Zodiac Mindwarp. Lead vocals on "Lager Woman from Hell" by Evil Bastard.

Other B-sides
 "Prime Mover" (Automatic Cannibal Mix) (4:42) – Manning – US "Prime Mover" 12" single (Vertigo/Mercury PRO 553-1).
 "Planet Girl" (The Invader Mix) (4:27) - Manning – UK "Planet Girl" 12" single (Mercury/Phonogram ZOD-312). 
 "The Zodiac-Scream" (0:07) – Manning – German one-sided promo single (Mercury 888 675-7).

Band
 Zodiac Mindwarp – vocals
 Cobalt Stargazer (Geoff Bird) – guitars
 Flash Bastard – guitars
 Trash D. Garbage – bass
 Slam Thunderhide (Stephen Landrum) – drums

References

1988 debut albums
Zodiac Mindwarp and the Love Reaction albums
Albums produced by Bill Drummond
Vertigo Records albums